Hockley is a village in Essex, England.

Hockley may also refer to:

Places
In England:
Hockley, Cheshire, a location
Hockley, Kent, a location
Hockley, Nottingham, an area of Nottingham City Centre, Nottinghamshire
Hockley, Solihull, West Midlands, on the border of Coventry
Hockley, Staffordshire, an area of Tamworth, see location
Hockley, Tendring, part of Frating, Essex
Hockley, West Midlands, an inner suburb of Birmingham, West Midlands
Hockley-in-the-Hole, London
Hockley Heath, West Midlands
Hockley Railway Viaduct, near Twyford, Hampshire 
In the United States:
Hockley (Gloucester, Virginia), an estate listed on the U.S. National Register of Historic Places
Hockley, Texas, Harris County, USA
Hockley, Virginia (disambiguation), several places
Hockley-in-the-Hole, Maryland, a historic site in Anne Arundel County, Maryland
Hockley County, Texas, USA
In Canada:
Hockley, Ontario

Other uses
 Hockley (surname)